Events from the year 1855 in the United States.

Incumbents

Federal Government 
 President: Franklin Pierce (D-New Hampshire)
 Vice President: vacant
 Chief Justice: Roger B. Taney (Maryland)
 Speaker of the House of Representatives: Linn Boyd (D-Kentucky)
 Congress: 33rd (until March 4), 34th (starting March 4)

Events
 January – Klamath and Salmon River War: In Klamath County, California, hostility between settlers and the local Native Americans becomes violent. The California State Militia and U.S. Army intervene, ending the war in March.
 January 23 – The first bridge over the Mississippi River opens in what is now Minneapolis, Minnesota (a crossing made today by the Hennepin Avenue Bridge).
 January 26 – The Point No Point Treaty is signed in the Washington Territory.
 February 12 – Michigan State University (the "pioneer" land-grant college) is established.
 February 15 – The North Carolina General Assembly incorporates the Western North Carolina Railroad to build a rail line from Salisbury to the western part of the state.
 February 22 – Pennsylvania State University is founded as the Farmers' High School of Pennsylvania.
 March 3 – The U.S. Congress appropriates $30,000 to create the U.S. Camel Corps.
 March 16 – Bates College is founded by abolitionists in Lewiston, Maine.
 March 30 – Elections are held for the first Kansas Territory legislature. Missourian 'Border Ruffians' cross the border in large numbers to elect a pro-slavery body.

 April – Cincinnati riots of 1855: Tension between nativists and German-American immigrants in Cincinnati breaks out into territorial street fighting on election day.
 May 17 – The Mount Sinai Hospital is dedicated (as the Jews' Hospital) in New York City; it opens to patients on June 5.
 June 6 – Portland Rum Riot: A crowd gathers at a storehouse believed to hold alcohol in Portland, Maine. The militia is called in and fires on the crowd to disperse the crowd, killing one person.
 June 28 – The Sigma Chi fraternity is founded at Miami University in Oxford, Ohio.
 July 1 – Quinault Treaty signed, Quinault and Quileute cede their land to the United States.
 July 2 – The Kansas Territorial Legislature convenes in Pawnee and begins passing proslavery laws.
 July 4 – Walt Whitman's poetry collection Leaves of Grass is published in Brooklyn.
 July 6 – The Kansas Territorial Legislature meets for the last time in Pawnee, voting to relocate to Shawnee, closer to the border of slave state Missouri.
 July 16 – U.S. Indian commissioner Isaac Stevens signs the Hellgate treaty with Native Americans living in modern-day western Montana.
 August 6 – Bloody Monday: Protestant mobs attack Irish and German Catholics on an election day in Louisville, Kentucky, causing 22 deaths.
 September 3 – First Sioux War: Battle of Ash Hollow – U.S. forces defeat a band of Brulé Lakota in present-day Garden County, Nebraska.
 October 5 – Yakima War: Battle of Toppenish Creek – In the Yakima River Valley, a band of Yakama warriors forces a company of U.S. soldiers to retreat in the first battle of the War.
 October 28–31 – First Fiji expedition: The U.S. Navy dispatches the USS John Adams to Viti Levu, Fiji, to protect American interests. One American sailor is killed and two Marines are wounded.
 November 1 – 31 people are killed in the Gasconade Bridge train disaster in Missouri.
 November 9–10 – Yakima War: Battle of Union Gap – American soldiers attack a Yakama village, forcing the village to retreat.
 November 21 – Large-scale Bleeding Kansas violence begins with events leading to the Wakarusa War between antislavery and proslavery forces.

Ongoing
 Samuel Colt incorporates his business as the Colt's Patent Firearms Manufacturing Company and opens a new factory, the Colt Armory, in Hartford, Connecticut. Horace Smith and Daniel B. Wesson form the Volcanic Repeating Arms Company in New England.
 California Gold Rush (1848–1855)
 Bleeding Kansas (1854–1860)
 Third Seminole War (1855–1858)
 Yakima War (1855–1858)

Births
 February 4 – George Cope, painter (died 1929)
 February 23 – Jonathan Bourne, Jr., U.S. Senator from Oregon from 1907 to 1913 (died 1940)
 June 14 – Robert M. La Follette, U.S. Senator from Wisconsin (died 1925)
 June 17 – Janet Cook Lewis, portrait painter, librarian, and bookbinder (died 1947)
 July 29 – Bowman Brown Law, politician (died 1916)
 August 4 – Jay Hunt, film director (died 1932)
 September 2 – M. Hoke Smith, U.S. Senator from Georgia from 1911 to 1920 (died 1931)
 October 21 – Howard Hyde Russell, temperance activist (died 1946)
 October 24 – James S. Sherman, 27th Vice President of the United States from 1909 to 1912 (died 1912)
 October 26 – Jessie Wilson Manning, American author and lecturer
 November 5 – Eugene V. Debs, union leader (died 1926)
 December 10 – August Spies, labor activist and newspaper editor (died 1887)
 December 28 – John William Wood, Sr., North Carolinan politician, founder of Benson, North Carolina (died 1928)

Deaths
 March 8 – William Poole, founder of the street gang the Bowery Boys and leader of the Know Nothing political movement (born 1821)
 March 25 – Thomas Fitzgerald, United States Senator from Michigan from 1848 till 1849. (born 1796)
 March 28 – William S. Archer, United States Senator from Virginia from 1841 till 1847.  (born 1789)
 May 7 – Walter T. Colquitt, United States Senator from Georgia from 1843 till 1848. (born 1799)
 June 29 – John Gorrie, physician, scientist, inventor, and humanitarian (born 1803)
 August 18 – Thomas Metcalfe, United States Senator from Kentucky from 1848 till 1849. (born 1780)

See also
Timeline of United States history (1820–1859)

References

External links
 

 
1850s in the United States
United States
United States
Years of the 19th century in the United States